Eupithecia pantellata is a moth in the family Geometridae. It is found in Spain, Portugal, Sicily and North Africa and the Canary Islands.

The wingspan is 14–16 mm.

Subspecies
Eupithecia pantellata pantellata
Eupithecia pantellata andalusica Wehrli, 1926
Eupithecia pantellata canariata Pinker, 1965

References

Moths described in 1875
pantellata
Moths of Europe
Moths of Africa